Bothwell was a county constituency in Lanarkshire represented in the House of Commons of the Parliament of the United Kingdom from 1918 to 1983. It was formed by the division of Lanarkshire constituency.

Boundaries 

From 1918 the constituency consisted of "The part of the Middle Ward County District which is contained within the parishes of Old Monkland and Bothwell, exclusive of all burghs or portions of burghs situated therein."

The Representation of the People Act 1948 provided that the constituency was to consist of "The sixth district, the electoral divisions of Baillieston, Mount Vernon and Carmyle, Springboig and Garrowhill in the ninth district and that part of the electoral division of Old Monkland in the said ninth district which is bounded on the North by the city of Glasgow and the burgh of Coatbridge, on the West by the electoral division of Baillieston and on the South and East by the electoral divisions of Tannochside and Bellshill North."

Members of Parliament

Election results

Elections in the 1910s

Elections in the 1920s

Elections in the 1930s

Elections in the 1940s

Elections in the 1950s

Elections in the 1960s

Elections in the 1970s

See also 
 1919 Bothwell by-election
 1926 Bothwell by-election
 Bothwell

References 

Historic parliamentary constituencies in Scotland (Westminster)
Constituencies of the Parliament of the United Kingdom established in 1918
Constituencies of the Parliament of the United Kingdom disestablished in 1983
Lanarkshire
Bothwell and Uddingston
Baillieston